Hope is a city in Hempstead County in southwestern Arkansas, United States. Hope is the county seat of Hempstead County and the principal city of the Hope Micropolitan Statistical Area, which includes all of Hempstead and Nevada counties. As of the 2010 census the population was 10,095, and in 2019 the population was estimated at 9,599.

Hope is the birthplace of three Arkansas governors: Bill Clinton (who was also President of the United States from 1993 to 2001), Mike Huckabee (who ran for the Republican presidential nomination in 2008 and 2016), and Sarah Huckabee Sanders (the incumbent governor and daughter of Mike Huckabee).

History

Hope began in 1873, when a railroad was built through the area. The town was named for Hope Loughborough, the daughter of a railroad executive.  In the 1902-1903 timeframe, the St. Louis, San Francisco and New Orleans Railroad was built into town; that line is now operated by the Kiamichi Railroad.

Geography

Demographics

2020 census

As of the 2020 United States census, there were 8,952 people, 3,375 households, and 2,447 families residing in the city.

2010 census
As of the 2010 United States Census, there were 10,095 people living in the city. The racial makeup of the city was 43.2% Black, 34.0% White, 0.2% Native American, 0.2% Asian, 0.1% Pacific Islander, 0.1% from some other race and 1.4% from two or more races. 20.8% were Hispanic or Latino of any race.

2000 census
As of the census of 2000, there were 10,616 people, 3,961 households, and 2,638 families living in the city. The racial makeup of the city was 47.71% White, 43.17% Black or African American, 0.38% Native American, 0.30% Asian, 0.03% Pacific Islander, 6.63% from other races, and 1.78% from two or more races. 13.48% of the population were Hispanic or Latino of any race.

There were 3,961 households, out of which 34.3% had children under the age of 18 living with them, 40.8% were married couples living together, 21.0% had a female householder with no husband present, and 33.4% were non-families. Of 3,961 households, 192 are unmarried partner households: 175 heterosexual. 29.3% of all households were made up of individuals, and 13.8% had someone living alone who was 65 years of age or older. The average household size was 2.61 and the average family size was 3.20.

In the city, the population was spread out, with 28.9% under the age of 18, 10.8% from 18 to 24, 27.3% from 25 to 44, 18.4% from 45 to 64, and 14.6% who were 65 years of age or older. The median age was 32 years. For every 100 females, there were 87.3 males. For every 100 females age 18 and over, there were 81.7 males.

The median income for a household in the city was $25,385, and the median income for a family was $28,445. Males had a median income of $23,525 versus $17,394 for females. The per capita income for the city was $12,783. About 22.3% of families and 27.2% of the population were below the poverty line, including 41.1% of those under age 18 and 17.3% of those age 65 or over.

Economy
Hope is also known for growing watermelons and continues to produce records for the largest specimens in the world. The last record was set by Lloyd Bright in 2005 with a 268.8-pound watermelon. The Watermelon Festival is celebrated annually from Thursday-Saturday during the second week of August. The watermelon is used in the municipal logo and the Hope slogan: A Slice of the Good Life.

Education

Public education at the elementary and secondary school level within the Hope city limits is provided by the Hope School District. Hope School District includes William Jefferson Clinton Primary School for Kindergarten through Fourth Grade, Beryl Henry Elementary School for fifth and sixth grade, Henry C. Yerger Middle School for seventh and eight grade, and Hope High School for ninth through 12th grades. Hope Academy of Public Service (HAPS) 5th-8th grade, HAPS Freshman Academy 9th grade, HAPS Collegiate Academy 10th-12th grade.

Hope also has a private school, Garrett Memorial.

Post-secondary educational opportunity is provided by the University of Arkansas at Hope.

The Spring Hill School District, while having a Hope postal address, is based outside of the city limits.

Media
Hope has three forms of local media. SWARK.Today and HopePrescott serve as the city's two Social Media News websites HopePrescott also produces the city's newspaper. There are also at least three local radio stations in and around Hope. The city is served by local television stations from the Little Rock Arkansas, Shreveport, Louisiana and Texarkana, Texas Ark-La-Tex markets. There are currently no local TV station(s) for Hope.

Infrastructure

Airport
Hope Municipal Airport is located on property that was once part of the Southwestern Proving Ground, one of six major military facilities in Arkansas during World War II.

At the time of its construction, the airport held claim of having the third longest runway in the United States. From 1942 to 1945 the airport and surrounding 50,078-acre Southwestern Proving Ground were used by the U.S. Army to test small arms ammunition, 20 to 155 mm projectiles, mortars, rockets, grenades, and up to 500-pound bombs. The City of Hope received the airport facility in 1947.

Paul Klipsch, a United States Army Veteran who served at the site, was among those who started businesses in the re-purposed buildings. He established Klipsch speaker company there and was known to joke that his desk was not in the same spot as the one he had during his service. "It was" he said, "on the other side of the room."

In the aftermath of Hurricane Katrina in 2005, FEMA used land near the airport as a staging area for manufactured homes intended as temporary housing for the hurricane victims; however, as of 2009, infrastructure and property damage remained so severe in the hurricane's path that many homes remained at the airport, eliciting criticism of the federal agency.

Rail service
In October 2009, Amtrak added Hope to its timetable brochure for its Texas Eagle service. On March 24, 2013, it was announced that service would begin on April 4. The Texas Eagle travels daily in each direction between Chicago and San Antonio.

Notable people

Hope is the hometown of former U.S. president Bill Clinton, whose childhood home is located in the town. At the 1992 Democratic National Convention in New York City, then-governor Clinton ended his acceptance speech by saying, "I still believe in a place called Hope." The city adopted this statement as its unofficial motto. The city converted its railroad depot to a museum about Clinton's life.

Hope is also the hometown of the former governor Mike Huckabee. In his autobiographical From Hope to Higher Ground (2007), Huckabee recalls the Hope of the 1960s as "a wonderful community. A child could leave his house in the morning on a bicycle and not return until after dark, and it caused no one alarm. It was the kind of place where I could misbehave eight blocks from home, but by the time I pedaled back to 309 East Second Street, six people would have called my parents to report my behavior. I am not sure that it took a village to raise a child, but I am quite sure that an entire village did its part to help raise me!" Mike Huckabee's daughter, former White House Press Secretary and current Arkansas governor Sarah Huckabee Sanders was also born in Hope.

Other political figures born in Hope include former U.S. Congressman Joseph Barton Elam of Louisiana's 4th congressional district, former White House chief of staff Mack McLarty, attorney Vince Foster, California Secretary of State Shirley Weber, former Arkansas secretary of state Kelly Bryant, and former Louisville, Kentucky mayor David L. Armstrong.

Others from Hope include talk radio host Gary Dee; PGA golfer Ken Duke, actress/vocalist Ketty Lester, and actress Melinda Dillon.

Paul Klipsch founded Klipsch and Associates in Hope in 1946. Klipsch invented the world-famous Klipschorn speaker, a folded horn loaded speaker that revolutionized the industry. The Klipschorn and a number of other speaker lines are still manufactured in Hope by Klipsch Audio Technologies.

Former U.S. representative Mike Ross of Arkansas's 4th congressional district is a former resident of Hope.

Climate
The climate is characterized by hot, humid summers and generally mild to cool winters. According to the Köppen Climate Classification system, Hope has a humid subtropical climate, abbreviated Cfa on climate maps.

References

External links

 
Cities in Arkansas
Cities in Hempstead County, Arkansas
Hope micropolitan area
County seats in Arkansas
Populated places established in 1875
1875 establishments in Arkansas
Bill Clinton
Mike Huckabee